The Seacoast Packing Company is a historic packing house in Beaufort, South Carolina that was listed on the National Register of Historic Places in 2008.  Also known as Peninsular Canning Company/Pig Factory and as Pickle Factory, it was built by Brooks Engineering. It was listed on the National Register of Historic Places in 2008.

References

Industrial buildings and structures on the National Register of Historic Places in South Carolina
Industrial buildings completed in 1920
Packing houses
Buildings and structures in Beaufort, South Carolina
National Register of Historic Places in Beaufort County, South Carolina
Pork